Blue Ridge Assembly Historic District is a national historic district located near Black Mountain, Buncombe County, North Carolina.  The district encompasses 29 contributing buildings and 1 contributing object associated with the Blue Ridge Assembly, conference center of the Young Men's Christian Association.  The main building is Eureka Hall (originally named Robert E. Lee Hall, but renamed in 2015) designed by Louis E. Jallade.  It was built in 1911–1912, and is a three-story, seven bay, frame building with a full-height octastyle portico. Also located on the large central courtyard are the Gymnasium (c. 1915), Asheville Hall (1926), Abbott Hall (1927), and College Hall (c. 1928).  Other notable buildings include the Martha Washington Residence (c. 1914), Craft and Child Care Center (c. 1925), and 19 frame cottages (1913-1927). Black Mountain College was founded here in 1933 and operated on the site until 1941.

It was listed on the National Register of Historic Places in 1979.

References

External links
Blue Ridge Assembly website

YMCA buildings in the United States
Historic districts on the National Register of Historic Places in North Carolina
Colonial Revival architecture in North Carolina
Neoclassical architecture in North Carolina
Buildings and structures in Buncombe County, North Carolina
National Register of Historic Places in Buncombe County, North Carolina